NBC's How Low Will You Go: Snapchat,” is a 2018 television series that consist of two players being challenge to do a dare for money and whoever do it for less money wins the game.

Background 
This is an NBC game-show produced by production company Above Average and airs on Snapchat. The series was created and written by Jon Perry.

Format 
Every episode is hosted by Jared Freid who challenges two contestants to one crazy dare for money, and whoever can do the dare for less money wins the game.

Cast

Main 

 Jared Freid as Himself (Host)

Guest Stars 

 Jenna Bush Hager as Herself
 Willie Geist as Himself

References

External links 

 How Low Will You Go: Snapchat at IMDb

2018 American television series debuts
English-language television shows
2010s American reality television series